Cosmorrhyncha is a genus of moths belonging to the subfamily Olethreutinae of the family Tortricidae.

Species
Cosmorrhyncha acrocosma (Meyrick, 1908) (Africa)
Cosmorrhyncha albistrigulana Brown and Razowski, 2020 (TL: Costa Rica) 
Cosmorrhyncha landryiBrown and Razowski, 2020 (TL: French Guiana)
Cosmorrhyncha macrospinaBrown and Razowski, 2020 (TL: Brazil)
Cosmorrhyncha microcosma Aarvik, 2004
Cosmorrhyncha obuduana  Razowski & Wojtusiak, 2012 (from Nigeria)
Cosmorrhyncha ocellata (Mabille, 1900) (from Madagascar & Comoros)
Cosmorrhyncha ocelliferana (Walker, 1863)
Cosmorrhyncha osana Brown and Razowski, 2020 (TL: Costa Rica)
Cosmorrhyncha parintina Brown and Razowski, 2020 (TL: Brazil)
Cosmorrhyncha tonsana (Mabille, 1900)

See also
List of Tortricidae genera

References

De Prins, J. & De Prins, W. 2015. Afromoths, online database of Afrotropical moth species (Lepidoptera). World Wide Web electronic publication (www.afromoths.net) (21.Jan.2015)
Revision of New World Cosmorrhyncha Meyrick, 1913 (Lepidoptera: Tortricidae: Olethreutinae), with descriptions of five new species

External links
tortricidae.com

Olethreutini
Tortricidae genera
Taxa named by Edward Meyrick